20th Politburo may refer to:
 20th Politburo of the Chinese Communist Party
 Presidium of the 20th Congress of the Communist Party of the Soviet Union